The canton of Moulins-Sud is a former administrative division of the Arrondissement of Moulins in the Allier department in central France. It was disbanded following the French canton reorganisation which came into effect in March 2015. It had 13,021 inhabitants (2012).

The canton comprised the following communes:
Bressolles
Moulins (partly)
Toulon-sur-Allier

See also
Cantons of the Allier department

References

Former cantons of Allier
2015 disestablishments in France
States and territories disestablished in 2015